The Maurice McCarten Stakes is an Australian Turf Club Group 3 Thoroughbred quality handicap horse race, for three years old and older, over a distance of 1100 metres at Rosehill Gardens Racecourse in Sydney, Australia in March.  Total prize money for the race is A$200,000.

History
The race is named in honour of jockey and racehorse-trainer Maurice Thomas Joseph McCarten (1902–1971).

Prior to 2010 the race was held on the Golden Slipper race card.

Name
 1993–1996 - The Moet & Chandon Handicap
 1997–1998 - The Moet & Chandon 
 1999–2002  - Moet & Chandon Stakes
 2003–2004 - Maurice McCarten Stakes
 2005–2009  - The Schweppervesence
 2010–2011 - Maurice McCarten Stakes
 2012 - Bacardi Together Stakes
 2013 - Bacardi World's No.1 Rum Stakes
 2014 - Bacardi Untameable Stakes
 2015 onwards - Maurice McCarten Stakes

Distance
1993–2009 - 1200 metres
2010 - 1100 metres

Grade
1993–2013 - Listed race
2014 onwards - Group 3

Winners

 2023 - Cannonball 
 2022 - Shelby Sixtysix 
 2021 - California Zimbol 
 2020 - Star Of The Seas 
 2019 - Easy Eddie 
 2018 - ‡Dothraki 
 2017 - Artistry 
 2016 - Alberto Magic 
 2015 - Target In Sight
 2014 - Kencella  
 2013 - See The World  
 2012 - Title 
 2011 - Atomic Force 
 2010 - Welkom Gold    
 2009 - Mount Verde   
 2008 - Hoystar     
 2007 - Double Dare      
 2006 - Snippetson      
 2005 - Britt's Best        
 2004 - Mustard      
 2003 - Sex Machine          
 2002 - Crete     
 2001 - †Stanzaic / Knickerbocker Kid   
 2000 - Antiquity    
 1999 - Appoint     
 1998 - Appoint     
 1997 - Quick Flick   
 1996 - Identikit 
 1995 - Magic Of Money   
 1994 - Brawny Spirit 
 1993 - Friend's Venture  

† Dead heat

‡ Won on Protest

See also
 List of Australian Group races
 Group races

External links 
First three place getters Maurice McCarten Stakes (ATC)

References

Horse races in Australia